Unedogemmula sondeiana is an extinct species of sea snail, a marine gastropod mollusk in the family Turridae, the turrids.

Description

Distribution
This extinct marine species was found in Pliocene strata in Java, Indonesia.

References

 [https://www.biodiversitylibrary.org/item/133650#page/63/mode/1up K. Martin, DDie fossilien von Java auf grund einer sammlung von Dr. R.D.M. Verbeek und von anderen; Geol. Reichs Mus., Meiden I p.35

External links
 A.W.B. Powell, The family Turridae in the Indo-Pacific. Part 1. The subfamily Turrinae; Indo-Pacific Mollusca I

sondeiana
Gastropods described in 1895